The Municipality of Moravske Toplice is a municipality in Slovenia, part of the Prekmurje region. Its seat is the spa settlement of Moravske Toplice. The municipality is an important center of Lutheranism in Slovenia. Large Lutheran churches are found throughout the municipality.

Settlements
In addition to the municipal seat of Moravske Toplice, the municipality also includes the following settlements:

 Andrejci
 Berkovci
 Bogojina
 Bukovnica
 Čikečka Vas
 Filovci
 Fokovci
 Ivanci
 Ivanjševci
 Ivanovci
 Kančevci
 Krnci
 Lončarovci
 Lukačevci
 Martjanci
 Mlajtinci
 Motvarjevci
 Noršinci
 Pordašinci
 Prosenjakovci
 Ratkovci
 Sebeborci
 Selo
 Središče
 Suhi Vrh
 Tešanovci
 Vučja Gomila

Demographics
Population by native language, 2002 census
Slovene:   5,617 (91.32%)
Hungarian: 324 (5.26%)
Others and Unknown:               210 (3.42%)
Total:                          6,151

The majority of the population is Roman Catholic, but the Lutheran minority makes up more than 40% of the population.

References

External links
 
 Municipality of Moravske Toplice on Geopedia
 Moravske Toplice municipal site

 
Moravske Toplice
1994 establishments in Slovenia